Éva Koch (born 18 January 1975) is a Hungarian alpine skier. She competed in the women's giant slalom at the 1994 Winter Olympics.

References

External links
 

1975 births
Living people
Hungarian female alpine skiers
Olympic alpine skiers of Hungary
Alpine skiers at the 1994 Winter Olympics
People from Sopron
Sportspeople from Győr-Moson-Sopron County